Crataegus harbisonii is a rare species of hawthorn.  Once common in the Nashville area, its population has been reduced significantly in modern times. It is now currently known only from small populations in Davidson and Obion County, Tennessee. This species has been taken into cultivation. It forms a vigorous shrub to 8 m in height with hairy leaves, attractive flowers and round reddish fruit.

It is closely related to Crataegus ashei and Crataegus triflora.

See also
Thomas Grant Harbison

References

harbisonii
Flora of North America